(born November 19, 1976) is a Japanese video game writer and founder of the visual novel publishing company Regista. He worked at KID from 1998 until 2004, leaving to form Regista after the release of Remember 11: The Age of Infinity. As of 2017, he now works at Too Kyo Games.

Work

Video games

Light novels

External links
  
 Nakazawa's blog 
 Regista homepage 

1976 births
Japanese writers
Living people
Japanese video game directors
Video game writers